The 2011 Barrow-in-Furness Borough Council election took place on 5 May 2011 to elect members of Barrow-in-Furness Borough Council in Cumbria, England. The whole council was up for election and the Labour Party gained overall control of the council from no overall control.

Campaign
Before the election no party had a majority on the council and Conservative Jack Richardson was the leader of the council with support from the independents. The whole council was being elected for a four-year term for the first time, changing from the previous system of election by thirds. Nine sitting councillors stood down at the election.

Issues in the campaign included dog fouling, potholes, jobs and keeping the environment clean.

Election result
The results saw Labour gain 13 seats to take control over the council with 29 seats. The Conservatives were reduced to 7 seats and only managed to hold all of the seats in the 2 wards of Hawcoat and Roosecote. Overall turnout in the election was 36.28%.

Both the Conservative leader of the council Jack Richardson and the Labour Member of Parliament for Barrow and Furness John Woodcock put the results down to the cuts the national, Conservative led, government were making.

Ward results

References

2011 English local elections
Barrow-in-Furness Borough Council elections
2010s in Cumbria